
Year 731 (DCCXXXI) was a common year starting on Monday (link will display the full calendar) of the Julian calendar. The denomination 731 for this year has been used since the early medieval period, when the Anno Domini calendar era became the prevalent method in Europe for naming years.

Events 
 By place 

 Europe 
 Umayyad conquest of Gaul: Munuza, Moorish governor of Cerdagne (eastern Pyrenees), rebels against Umayyad authority. He is defeated and executed by Muslim forces under Abdul Rahman Al Ghafiqi at Urgell (Catalonia). Muslim garrisons in Septimania raid the cities Millau and Arles.
 Ragenfrid, ex-mayor of the palace of Neustria, meets Duke Eudes of Aquitaine, to accept his rule and independence from the Frankish Kingdom. Fearing an alliance against him, Charles Martel exiles Ragenfrid's supporter Wandon of Fontenelle, and imprisons bishop Aimar of Auxerre.  
 Charles Martel leads two raids across the Loire River into the Berry region. The Franks seize and plunder Bourges (central France), but the city is immediately recaptured by Eudes of Aquitaine.

 Britain 
 Autumn – King Ceolwulf of Northumbria is deposed by opponents, and forced to enter a monastery. His supporters subsequently restore him to the throne (or 732).
 King Æthelbald of Mercia overruns a large portion of Somerset, and wrests the county from Wessex control (approximate date).

 Asia 
 Battle of the Defile: An Umayyad relief army (28,000 men) is sent to Samarkand (modern Uzbekistan), which is besieged by the Turgesh. The Muslims are ambushed near the Zarafshan Range, at the Tashtakaracha Pass.Kennedy (2007), p. 285 The battle results in a Pyrrhic victory, with heavy casualties for the Umayyad army, halting Muslim expansion in Central Asia for almost two decades.

 By topic 

 Literature 
 Bede, Anglo-Saxon monk and historian, completes his Historia ecclesiastica gentis Anglorum at the monastery of Saint Peter at Monkwearmouth. 

 Religion 
 February 11 – Pope Gregory II dies at Rome after a 16-year reign, in which he has fought Iconoclasm. He is succeeded by the Syrian-born cleric Gregory III, as the 90th pope of the Catholic Church.
 A Moorish raiding party under Abdul Rahman Al Ghafiqi invades deep into Burgundy, and plunders the monastery of Luxeuil Abbey, located in the Haute-Saône, massacring most of the community.
 November 1 – Synod of Rome: Gregory III summons a council at the shrine of Saint Peter. All western bishops participate, including the Roman  nobility. Gregory condemns Iconoclasm as a heresy.

Births 
 Abd al-Rahman I, Muslim emir of Córdoba (d. 788)
 Ōtomo no Otomaro, Japanese general  and Shōgun (d. 809)
 Telets, ruler (khagan) of the Bulgarian Empire (approximate date)

Deaths 
 February 11 – Gregory II, pope of the Catholic Church (b. 669)
 March 13 – Gerald of Mayo, Anglo-Saxon abbot
 August 31 – Ōtomo no Tabito, Japanese poet (b. 665)
 December 22 – Yuan Qianyao, official of the Chinese Tang Dynasty
 date unknown
 Barjik, prince of the Khazar Khaganate
 Berhtwald, archbishop of Canterbury
 Munuza, Moorish governor of Cerdagne 
 Ragenfrid, mayor of the palace of Neustria
 Yuwen Rong, chancellor of the Tang Dynasty (or 730)

References